The Argentine presidential election of 1874 was held on 12 April to choose the president of Argentina. Nicolás Avellaneda was elected president.

Background

President Sarmiento's pragmatic approach to Buenos Aires demands and his successful control of separatist revolts in the north paved the way to high office for his vice president, Autonomist Party leader Adolfo Alsina. Alsina gained the support of a sizable facion of Mitre's Nationalist Party, resulting in the formation of the paramount political group in Argentina for the next 42 years: The National Autonomist Party (PAN). Mitre himself did not support Alsina, however, whom he viewed as a veiled Buenos Aires separatist. The elder statesman ran for the presidency again, though the seasoned Alsina outmaneuvered him by fielding Nicolás Avellaneda, a moderate lawyer from remote Tucumán Province. The electoral college met on 12 April 1874, and awarded Mitre only three provinces, including Buenos Aires.

As he had repeatedly up to 1861, Mitre took up arms again. Hoping to prevent Avellaneda's 12 October inaugural, he mutineered a gunboat; he was defeated, however, and only President Avellaneda's commutation spared his life.

Results

Results by Province

Notes

References
 
 
 
 

1874 elections in South America
1874 in Argentina
1874
Elections in Argentina